
Gmina Bielawy is a rural gmina (administrative district) in Łowicz County, Łódź Voivodeship, in central Poland.

Villages
Gmina Bielawy contains the villages and settlements of Bielawska Wieś, Bielawy, Bogumin, Borów, Borówek, Brzozów, Chruślin, Drogusza, Emilianów, Gaj, Gosławice, Helin, Janinów, Łazin, Leśniczówka, Marianów, Marywil, Oszkowice, Piaski Bankowe, Piotrowice, Przezwiska, Psary, Rulice, Seligi, Skubiki, Sobocka Wieś, Sobota, Stare Orenice, Stare Piaski, Stary Waliszew, Traby, Trzaskowice, Walewice, Waliszew Dworski, Wojewodza, Wola Gosławska, Zakrzew, Żdżary and Zgoda.

Neighbouring gminas
Gmina Bielawy is bordered by the gminas of Bedlno, Domaniewice, Głowno, Łowicz, Piątek and Zduny.

References
Polish official population figures 2006

Bielawy
Łowicz County